Ripley Entertainment Inc. is an entertainment and edutainment holding company owned by the Jim Pattison Group of Vancouver, British Columbia, Canada. The company has its headquarters in an unincorporated part of southern Orange County, Florida, near Orlando, at an office complex near the intersection of Sand Lake Road and John Young Parkway.

Originating with a small daily newspaper cartoon drawn by Robert Ripley, which debuted in 1918, the company now operates more than 90 attractions under a dozen brands worldwide.

The daily Believe It or Not! cartoon that catapulted Ripley to fame in the 1920s is still printed and runs in hundreds of newspapers in more than 40 countries and in dozens of languages.

The 32 Ripley’s Believe It or Not! museums that house its signature collection of oddities in various countries have received more than 100 million visitors since 1933.

Publishing interests 
Ripley Entertainment Inc. established Ripley Publishing Ltd to produce the Ripley's Believe It or Not Annual and other books.

Holdings
Guinness World Records Attractions
Louis Tussaud's Wax Museums: In the summer of 2004, Ripley's bought the Palace of Wax museum in Grand Prairie, Texas, rebranding it as the United States' first Tussauds'.
Ripley's Aquarium of Canada - Toronto, Ontario, Canada
Ripley's Aquarium of Myrtle Beach - Myrtle Beach, South Carolina, U.S.
Ripley's Aquarium of the Smokies - Gatlinburg, Tennessee, U.S.
Ripley's Believe it or Not! Odditoriums - 32 locations in Australia, Canada, China, Denmark, India, Malaysia, Mexico, Netherlands, Thailand, U.K., and U.S.
Ripley's Haunted Adventure - three locations in US and one in Thailand
Ripley's Mini-Golf and Arcade - Gatlinburg, Tennessee, U.S.
Ripley's Moving Theater - various locations.
Ripley’s Red Train Tours - St. Augustine, Florida, U.S.
Ripley's Mirror Maze - Gatlinburg, Tennessee, San Antonio, Texas, Myrtle Beach, South Carolina, Ocean City, Maryland. All U.S.
Ripley's Davy Crockett Mini-Golf - Gatlinburg, Tennessee, U.S.
Ripley's Old McDonald Mini-Golf - Sevierville, Tennessee, U.S.
Ride the Ducks - Branson, MO

References

 About Ripley Entertainment

External links
 Ripley Entertainment website

Entertainment companies of the United States
Companies based in Orlando, Florida
Jim Pattison Group
Ripley's Believe It or Not!